Tall Unlimited (トール アンリミテッド) (Tall Infinity in North America) is a puzzle video game released December 22, 1999, in Japan for the PlayStation. On October 19, 2010, the game was released on the PlayStation 3 and the PlayStation Portable as a "PSOne Classic."

The main objective of the game is to strategically construct a tower with multi-colored blocks.

References

PlayStation (console) games
PlayStation Portable games
PlayStation 3 games
Puzzle video games
1999 video games
Video games developed in Japan
Agetec games